Alberto Gallo (born 28 April 1975 in Padova) is an Italian retired footballer. He played as a striker.  After playing for Padova youth teams, he made his debut in Serie A on 5 November 1995 against Roma. He then played for Monza in Serie C1 and Serie B, and after that again in Serie C1 with Ancona, Arezzo and Varese and in Serie C2 for Trento. He then went to play for the amateurs.

Career
1994-1995  Padova 1 (0)
1995-1998  Monza 57 (3)
1998  Ancona 6 (0)
1998-1999  Atletico Catania 16 (2)
1999-2000  Arezzo 23 (3)
2000-2002  Varese 35 (5)
2002-2003  Trento 22 (1)
2003-2004  Città di Jesolo 28 (7)
2004-2005  Borgomanero 30 (3)
2005-2006  Palazzolo 23 (7)
2006-2007  Montecchio Maggiore 52 (18)
2007-2008  Castellana Castelgoffredo  5 (0)
2008-2009  Montecchio Maggiore  32 (9)
2009-  Abano  29 (8)

External links
 
 football.it
 calciatori.com
 footballplayerjob.com
 fullsoccer.eu

1975 births
Living people
Italian footballers
Serie A players
Serie B players
Calcio Padova players
Association football forwards